The No. 1 Capitol District Building, on the site of the former Armed Services YMCA Building, now houses the Hawaii State Art Museum and the Hawaii State Foundation on Culture and the Arts.

History
While they were both in the cabinet, under King Kamehameha V, American politicians John Mott-Smith and Charles Coffin Harris convinced the legislature to fund a hotel. It first opened in 1872.
The hotel was converted to a YMCA in 1917 and used by the military in World War I. In 1926 the termite-infested building was finally torn down, and a new one designed in Spanish mission style by Lincoln Rogers of the firm Emory & Webb.

The new building was dedicated on March 16, 1928. The two-story U-shaped building includes a swimming pool in its courtyard.
It is located at 250 South Hotel Street, Honolulu, Hawaii. Across Richards Street is the Hawaii State Capitol building. The area was added to the National Register of Historic Places listings in Oahu as the Hawaii Capital Historic District on December 1, 1978.

Museum
The Hawaii State Art Museum is operated by the Hawaii State Foundation on Culture and the Arts, and is located on the second floor of the No. 1 Capitol District Building. Admission is free at all times.

The museum consists of three galleries. In addition to changing temporary exhibitions, there is a permanent display of Hawaiian art. It reflects a mix of Hawaii's ethnic and cultural traditions through 132 works of art by 105 artists. In a wide variety of artistic styles, movements, and media, the exhibition illustrates the varied cultural influences that fuel the creativity of Hawaii's artists. The museum is open everyday from 10:00 a.m. to 4:00 p.m.

Predominately comprising works dating from the 1960s to the present, the exhibition depicts the expression of artists throughout the state and their profound contributions toward understanding the people of Hawaii and their aspirations. Sculptor Satoru Abe (born 1926), sculptor Bumpei Akaji (1921-2002), sculptor Sean K. L. Browne (born 1953), sculptor Edward M. Brownlee (born 1929), Mark Chai (born 1954), Jean Charlot (1898-1979), Isami Doi (1883-1931), Juliette May Fraser (1887-1983), Hon Chew Hee (1906-1993), ceramicist Jun Kaneko (born 1942), John Melville Kelly (1877-1962), Sueko Matsueda Kimura (1912-2001), ceramicist Sally Fletcher-Murchison (born 1933), printmaker Huc-Mazelet Luquiens (1881-1961), ceramicist David Kuraoka (born 1946), Ben Norris (1910-2006), Louis Pohl (1915-1999), sculptor Esther Shimazu (born 1957), Shirley Ximena Hopper Russell (1886-1985), Tadashi Sato (1954-2005), Reuben Tam (1916-1991), ceramicist Toshiko Takaezu (1922-2011), Masami Teraoka (born 1936), Madge Tennent (1889-1972), and sculptor Michael Tom (1946-1999) are among the artists whose works are on display.

References

External links

Art museums and galleries in Hawaii
Historic district contributing properties in Hawaii
Hotel buildings completed in 1928
Museums in Honolulu
1872 establishments in Hawaii
National Register of Historic Places in Honolulu